Klara Barth (23 December 1880 – 13 June 1940) was a German politician from the Bavarian People's Party. She served as Member of the Bavarian Landtag between 1920 and 1933.

References

1880 births
1940 deaths
People from Saarpfalz-Kreis
Bavarian People's Party politicians
20th-century German women politicians